Gabriele Renate "Gabi" Hirschbichler (born 26 December 1983) is a German speed skater. She was born in Traunstein. She competed at the 2011 World Sprint Speed Skating Championships in Heerenveen, and at the 2014 Winter Olympics in Sochi, in 500 meters and 1000 meters.

References

External links 
 
 
 
 

1983 births
German female speed skaters
Speed skaters at the 2014 Winter Olympics
Speed skaters at the 2018 Winter Olympics
Olympic speed skaters of Germany
People from Traunstein (district)
Sportspeople from Upper Bavaria
Living people
21st-century German women